The following events occurred in June 1985:

June 1, 1985 (Saturday)
Akira Kurosawa's film Ran, based on King Lear, is released in Japan. With a budget of $11 million, it is the most expensive Japanese film produced up to this time, and wins numerous awards.
"Battle of the Beanfield": The UK's largest mass arrest (of 300 "travellers") takes place, leading to the end of free access to Stonehenge.
Tropical Storm Andres forms south of Acapulco, Mexico, eventually reaching a maximum intensity of 70 mph (110 km/h) while located south of the Baja California Peninsula.
A great day for the Andretti family. First Mario Andretti clinched the pole position for the Indy Car Miller American 200 with a record speed of 147.608 miles per hour and Jeff Andretti won the pole for the Milwaukee Bosch-Volkswagen Super Vee race.
Two eventually great albums hit the record stores on this day – A-ha's Hunting High and Low, which featured their breakthrough hit "Take On Me", and Sting's first solo effort without The Police called The Dream of the Blue Turtles which featured great singles like "Fortress Around Your Heart".
Died: Richard Greene, 66, English actor, best known for the title role in the 1950s television series The Adventures of Robin Hood.

June 2, 1985 (Sunday)Indulgence, a British yacht due to compete in the America's Cup, runs aground and sank off the Isle of Wight. All ten crew are rescued by Local Hero.

June 3, 1985 (Monday)American, a retired US schooner, is scuttled to create an artificial reef in the North Atlantic Ocean east of Ocean City, New Jersey. Her masts break loose and are removed.
Larry Bird of the Boston Celtics was named the NBA MVP for the second year in a row. Bird collected 73 of 78 first place votes and 763 of the possible 780 votes. Bird led his Celtics back to the NBA Finals for the second year in a row.

June 4, 1985 (Tuesday)
The Farø Bridges, connecting two of Denmark's main islands, are opened by Queen Margrethe II of Denmark.
Legendary golfer Arnold Palmer failed to qualify for the U.S. Open golf championship for the second year in a row when he shot a 77 and a 71 at the U.S. Open qualifier at the Bay Hill Golf Club in Orlando, Florida.

June 5, 1985 (Wednesday)
In the final of Australia's National Panasonic Cup rugby league competition, the Balmain Tigers defeat the Cronulla-Sutherland Sharks at the Leichhardt Oval.

June 6, 1985 (Thursday)
Police and pathologists exhume the remains of Nazi physician Josef Mengele, who had been buried in Embu das Artes, Brazil, in 1979 under the pseudonym of Wolfgang Gerhard.
Soviet cosmonauts Vladimir Dzhanibekov and Viktor Savinykh (Soyuz T-13) arrive at the Salyut 7 space station to carry out repairs.
Died: Vladimir Jankélévitch, 81, French philosopher and musicologist

June 7, 1985 (Friday)
In the LPBT Hammer Midwest open. Patty Costello bested Robin Romeo 209-207 in the championship game to capture the title.
The Goonies was released in theaters.

June 8, 1985 (Saturday)
Hurricane Blanca is reported in the Pacific, reaching peak intensity on June 13 and causing travel restrictions along the western coast of Mexico.
Creme Fraiche won the Belmont Stakes and gave owner Woody Stephens his 4th Straight Belmont Stakes win.

June 9, 1985 (Sunday)
In the 1985 Northern Cypriot presidential election, Rauf Denktaş of the National Unity Party is re-elected.
In the finals of the French Open tennis tournament in Paris, Heinz Günthardt and Martina Navratilova take the Mixed Doubles title, while Mark Edmondson and Kim Warwick win the Men's Doubles and Mats Wilander takes the Men's Singles.
Born:
Sonam Kapoor, Indian actress, in Mumbai

June 10, 1985 (Monday)
The New Jersey Generals beat the Jacksonville Bulls 31-24 as Herschel Walker rushed for 162 yards and become pro football's all time single season rushing yardage record as he surprised Eric Dickerson's 1984 NFL record of 2,105 by 24 yards.
Died: Bob Prince 68, the legendary voice of the Pittsburgh Pirates Major League Baseball club for 28 years

June 11, 1985 (Tuesday)
HaBonim disaster: A train collides with a bus carrying children from Y.H. Brenner middle school in Petah Tikva, on an unmanned level crossing near Moshav HaBonim. The 22 people killed included 19 pupils, a teacher, the bus driver, and a parent chaperone. A further 17 are injured.
Wayne Gretzky of the Edmonton Oilers was named the Lester B. Pearson award as the best regular season hockey player for the fourth straight year.
Died: Karen Ann Quinlan, 31, American graduate, subject of a right-to-die controversy

June 12, 1985 (Wednesday)
The Instituto de Aeronáutica Civil de Cuba, Cuba′s civil aviation authority, is established.

June 13, 1985 (Thursday)
A package containing a bomb, planted by the Unabomber, is discovered at the Boeing offices in Auburn, Washington, United States, and is disarmed by experts.

June 14, 1985 (Friday)
TWA Flight 847 is hijacked by Hezbollah-linked terrorists during a flight from Athens to Rome. One of the 153 passengers is killed. Greek police arrest a Lebanese suspect on September 21, 2019.
The Schengen Agreement is signed, creating the Schengen Area, a group of member states of the European Economic Community with no internal border controls.
Died: Robert Stethem, 23, a U.S. Navy Petty Officer, shot by terrorist hijackers

June 15, 1985 (Saturday)
Pioneering animation studio, Studio Ghibli, is established in Tokyo, Japan.
In the Timaru by-election in New Zealand caused by the death of the previous incumbent, Maurice McTigue wins the seat from Labour for the New Zealand National Party.
The Mexican ship Aktahun is seriously damaged by fire following the explosion of mooring vessel Pemex 383 at Coatzacoalcos.
Died: Percy Fender, 92, English cricketer

June 16, 1985 (Sunday)
The Soviet Union defeat Czechoslovakia in the final of the EuroBasket 1985 tournament at Hanns-Martin-Schleyer-Halle, Stuttgart, Germany.
The 1985 24 Hours of Le Mans motor race, in France, is won by the Joest Racing team of Klaus Ludwig, Paolo Barilla and "John Winter" (Louis Krages).
The 1985 Canadian Grand Prix is held at Circuit Gilles Villeneuve, Montreal, and is won by Michele Alboreto.
The British ship Bridgeness runs aground on the Hats and Barrels Reef off the Welsh coast, and sinks. 

June 17, 1985 (Monday)
TWA Flight 847 hijacking: In Beirut hijackers release Greek singer Demis Roussos, a passenger on the plane, in exchange for their accomplice Ali Atwa, and take 40 other passengers as hostages.
Flight STS-51-G, the fifth flight of the Space Shuttle Discovery, is launched from Kennedy Space Center, Florida, United States. The crew includes Sultan bin Salman Al Saud, who achieved a number of firsts by doing so: he was the first member of a royal family to fly in space, the first Arab to fly in space, the first Muslim to fly in space, and at 28 years of age the youngest person to travel on the Space Shuttle.
The Discovery Channel is launched on United States television.

June 18, 1985 (Tuesday)
Prior to this year's Wimbledon, the seedings we're announced. The men's no. 1 seed for this event was John McEnroe and the women's seed sees two number ones, Chris Evert and Martina Navratilova.

June 19, 1985 (Wednesday)
1985 Frankfurt airport bombing: Bombs planted at Frankfurt Airport, West Germany, kill three people and injure a further 74. It will take three years for the perpetrators to be confirmed with any certainty as members of the Palestinian Abu Nidal Organization.

June 20, 1985 (Thursday)
1985 Nepal bombings: A series of coordinated bombings takes place in Nepal's major cities, killing eight people in all. Several members of the Nepal Janabadi Morcha are arrested and charged.
1985 Irish local elections: Local elections take place in all Ireland's cities, towns and counties. Fianna Fáil obtains the largest number of votes.

June 21, 1985 (Friday)
Braathens SAFE Flight 139: The first aircraft hijacking in the history of Norway takes place when Stein Arvid Huseby takes control of a Boeing 737-205 with 121 people on board, on a domestic flight from Trondheim Airport to Oslo Airport in Fornebu. Huseby, a drunk, demands to be allowed to make a political statement and meet Norwegian Prime Minister Kåre Willoch and Minister of Justice Mona Røkke. After the aircraft runs out of beer, Huseby trades his weapon for more beer and Norwegian police storm the plane and arrest him.
Cocoon was released in theaters.
Born: Lana Del Rey, American singer-songwriter and record producer, in New York City, under the name Elizabeth Woolridge Grant
Died: Tage Erlander, Swedish politician, Prime Minister from 1946 to 1969, in Huddinge

June 22, 1985 (Saturday)
In the final of the 1985 English Greyhound Derby, held for the first time at the Wimbledon Stadium following the closure of the White City Stadium, the winner is Pagan Swallow.

June 23, 1985 (Sunday)
1985 Narita International Airport bombing: A bomb goes off in Narita International Airport in Japan, hidden amongst luggage intended for Air India Flight 301 to Bangkok, Thailand. Two baggage handlers are killed and another four injured. 
Air India Flight 182: Fifty-five minutes after the explosion at Narita International Airport, the Boeing 747 Emperor Kanishka'', explodes off the Irish coast, killing all 329 people on board. The authorities responsible for security were found to have made errors that enabled the suspected terrorist incident to take place.

June 24, 1985 (Monday)
An estimated 30,000 farmers march on Parliament House, Melbourne, protesting against government policies and demanding a "fair go".
1983 Heisman Trophy Winner Mike Rozier who played for the USFL's Jacksonville Bulls jumped leagues to sign a 4-year $2 Million dollar contract to play for the NFL's Houston Oilers.

June 25, 1985 (Tuesday)
Born: Karim Matmour, Algerian international footballer, in Strasbourg, France

June 26, 1985 (Wednesday)
Defeat for the Conservative government of the Canadian province of Ontario in a motion of no confidence on the speech from the throne results in Frank Miller being replaced as Premier by David Peterson, the province's first Liberal premier for 42 years.
Svetlana Ogorodnikova and her husband Nikolai Ogorodnikov both plead guilty to a charge of conspiring to pass classified information to the Soviet Union and are given prison sentences.
Born: Arjun Kapoor, Indian actor, in Mumbai, the son of film producer Boney Kapoor and entrepreneur Mona Shourie Kapoor

June 27, 1985 (Thursday)
1985 diethylene glycol wine scandal: Analysis carried out during routine quality checks reveals that a 1983 Ruster Auslese, an Austrian wine from a supermarket in Stuttgart, Germany, has been adulterated with a toxic compound. The discovery sparks an international scandal. 
Died: The Cradock Four: Fort Calata, 28, Matthew Goniwe, 38, Sicelo Mhlauli, 36, and Sparrow Mkhonto, 33, anti-apartheid activists who were abducted and murdered by South African security police

June 28, 1985 (Friday)
Featherweight Calvin Grove of Coatesville defeating defending champion Irving Mitchell in a 12 round United States Boxing Association title fight.
Mario Andretti continued to add another pole position in his illustrious racing career. This time at the U.S. Grand Prix at the Meadowlands where he was on the pole with a speed of 98.452 miles per hour.

June 29, 1985 (Saturday)
The 1985 Dutch TT motorcycle racing event concludes at the TT Circuit Assen in the Netherlands. Winners are Pier Paolo Bianchi (125 cc), Freddie Spencer (250cc) and Randy Mamola (500cc).
1984 Olympic Champion Michael Gross set a world record in the men's 200-meter butterfly with a time of 1 minute 57.01 in the West German Swimming Championships.
Mad Max Beyond Thunderdome was released in theatres featuring Mel Gibson and Tina Turner.

June 30, 1985 (Sunday)
TWA Flight 847: The final few hostages from the June 14 hijacking are released by terrorists in Beirut and transported to Syria for their return home, after an intervention by US President Ronald Reagan.
U.S. Route 66 is officially removed from the United States Highway System after being bypassed by the Interstate Highway System.

References

1985
1985-06
1985-06